Winter's Turning is a folk album released in 1986 by Robin Williamson. The album was recorded in Los Angeles.

The album dwelled into the winter holidays and British Isle lore. Williamson does this through instrumental folk and folk ballads. Williamson utilizes the acoustic instruments, including mandolin, hammered dulcimer, and guitar, to the fullest. There is an equal balance of the instrumentals along with vocal performances.

Track listing 
Drive The Cold Winter Away/Cold and Raw
Avant De S'En Aller
Past Time with Good Company/Somerset Wassail
Greensleeves Morris/Green Groweth the Holly/Eagle's Whistle
Past 1 O'clock/Great Tom's Cast
Sheep Under The Snow/Welsh Morris
Praetorius' Courante/Drive The Cold Winter Away
Blow Blow Thou Winter Wynd/Vivaldi's Winter Largo/Trip to the Boar/Manage The Miser
Carolan's Quarrel With The Landlady/Christmas Eve
Hunting the Wren
Corelli's Sonato/36 Allegro/Scottish Country Dance
Polka du Tapis

References

1986 albums
Robin Williamson albums